Bourtie Parish Church is a church in Bourtie, near Oldmeldrum in Aberdeenshire, Scotland. Now a Category A listed building, it was built in 1806, to a design by William and Andrew Clerk, and is a near-square form.

Its ogee-canopied pulpit is original, with precentor's box and other fittings. The church's bell was made in 1760 by John Mowat.

References

External links

Churches in Aberdeenshire
1806 establishments in Scotland
Churches completed in 1806
Category A listed buildings in Aberdeenshire
Listed churches in Scotland